Michael John Nott (9 November 1916 – 3 February 1988) was an Anglican priest.

Nott was born in 1916, educated at St Paul's and King's College London and ordained in 1939. His first posts were at Abington, Reading and Kettering. Following this he was Rural Dean of Seaford, Senior Chaplain to the Archbishop of Canterbury and then Archdeacon of Maidstone and a canon residentiary of Canterbury Cathedral. In 1972 he became Provost of Portsmouth. He resigned in 1982.

References

1916 births
1988 deaths
People educated at St Paul's School, London
Alumni of King's College London
Fellows of King's College London
Archdeacons of Canterbury
Archdeacons of Maidstone
Provosts and Deans of Portsmouth
Alumni of Lincoln Theological College